Chandla is a town and a nagar panchayat in Chhatarpur district  in the state of Madhya Pradesh, India.

Geography
It has an average elevation of 177 metres (580 feet). It is hilly and located on the bank of Ken river.

Demographics
 India census, Chandla had a population of 10,207. Males constitute 53% of the population and females 47%. Chandla has an average literacy rate of 57%, lower than the national average of 59.5%; with male literacy of 66% and female literacy of 46%. 20% of the population is under 6 years of age.

References

Bundelkhand
Chhatarpur